Podyvotye is a rural locality (a selo) in Sevsky District, Bryansk Oblast, Russia. The population was 540 as of 2010. There are 7 streets.

Geography 
Podyvotye is located 31 km southwest of Sevsk (the district's administrative centre) by road. Saranchino is the nearest rural locality.

Notable citizens
Alexander Bolshunov

References 

Rural localities in Sevsky District
Sevsky Uyezd